Mecano is the debut studio album recorded by Spanish synth-pop homonymous band Mecano, released on April 5, 1982 under the label Discos CBS.

The album spawned five singles, "Hoy No Me Puedo Levantar", "Perdido en mi Habitación", "Me Colé en Una Fiesta", "Maquillaje" and "No Me Enseñen la Lección", all of them receiving pop culture popularity in Spain. While two of them made it to number one in the Spanish Airplays. Those being "Me Colé en Una Fiesta" and "Maquillaje". Both spending a week at the top of the charts, while the first of them spent six week stop the Spanish Singles Sales Chart. While "Hoy No Me Puedo Levantar" and "Perdido en mi Habitación" made it into the top 10 of the Spanish charts, peaking at number four and number two respectively.

Mecano is one of the most commercially successful Spanish albums of all time, selling not much after its release 350.000 pure units and by the end of the year it had already sold over 1.000.000 only in Spain. Thus elevating Mecano to become the best selling Spanish group and artist of the moment.

With a refreshing style of music, Mecano crowned the homonymous band as the new music sensations in Spain back in the early 80s, receiving a commercial and critic success.

AllMusic rated the album with four out of five stars, adding, "Mecano is their first record, and one of their most popular, a glamorous effort in which listeners can already appreciate Nacho Cano's brilliant mind for composition. Synths and electronic devices mixed with poppy melodies and Torroja's sweet voice are heard throughout the record, forming a style that became the group's personal trademark from then on".

Mecano is better known in popular slang as the clock album due to the large clock that appears on the cover. In the 2005 re-issue a new track "Quiero Vivir En La Ciudad" was included as a bonus track.

Track listing

Versión 12", 1982 

 Bonus Tracks included on the B-side of some vinyl singles and maxi-singles

 "Quiero vivir en la ciudad".
 "Viaje espacial" (single version).
 "Napoleón".
 "Súper-Ratón".

Singles

Covers

Maquillaje has later been recorded by many singers and bands, among them:
Yuri (1989)
Amarillo (2005)
Ana Torroja (2006)
Tatiana (2007)
Cherry Ahava (2009)
Jot Dog (2010)
Nacho Cano presenta: Mecandance (2011)

Charts

Album Charts

Sales and certifications

Personnel
 Ana Torroja (vocals)
 Nacho Cano (keyboards, background vocals)
 Jose Maria Cano (guitars, background vocals)
 Manolo Aguilar (bass)
 Javier de Juan (Linn LM-1 drum machines on tracks 1-5, 7-11)
 Peter Van Hooke (Linn LM-1 drum machine and Simmons electronic drums on track 6)
 Luis Cobos (Linn LM-1 drum machine, sound effects, keyboards, and sax on "Quiero Vivir En La Ciudad")
 Carlos García-Vaso (uncredited; guitars on several tracks of the album)

References

 

1982 albums
Mecano albums